Brassia arcuigera, the arching brassia, is a species of orchid. It is native to Honduras, Costa Rica, Panama, Colombia, Venezuela, Ecuador, and Peru. The subspecies B. a. longissima is most notable for its very large flowers; as much as 21 inches (53 centimeters) wide "tip to tip".

References

arcuigera
Orchids of Central America
Orchids of South America